Cock Robin is the first album by American band Cock Robin and was released in 1985.

It was a Top 10 hit album in numerous European countries whereas it charted only at #61 in the United States Top 75. The singles "When Your Heart Is Weak" and "The Promise You Made" met with the most success in Europe, and still get regular airplay on adult contemporary and pop music stations in countries like France, Italy, Belgium and the Netherlands.

The music video to "When Your Heart Is Weak" was directed by Chris Gabrin, and filmed in the California desert Joshua Tree National Park (home of guitarist Clive Wright, former member of the group) in May 1985.

Track listing

All songs by Peter Kingsbery.

Musicians

Cock Robin
Peter Kingsbery – lead vocals, keyboards, bass guitar, synthesizer programming
Anna LaCazio – lead vocals and Casio keyboards synthesizer
Louis Molino III – drums, percussion and backing vocals
Clive Wright – guitars, Roland GR-300

Additional musicians
Paulinho da Costa – percussion
Pat Mastelotto – percussion
Arno Lucas – percussion
Paul Fox – synthesizer programming
Steve Hillage – production, rhythm guitar (tracks 2, 14, 17)
David Sanborn – alto sax solo (tracks 14, 17)
Jimmy Maelen – percussion (tracks 14, 17)
Roy Martin – Simmons drums (tracks 14, 17)

Miscellaneous
Produced by Steve Hillage

Singles:
 "When Your Heart Is Weak" – #35 U.S. Pop., August 1985.
 "The Promise You Made" – Did not chart in the U.S.  
 "Thought You Were On My Side" – Did not chart in the U.S.

Charts
 #7 France
 #9 Germany
 #4 Italy
 #2 Netherlands
 #11 Switzerland
 #30 Sweden
 #61 United States

Certifications

References

Cock Robin (band) albums
1985 debut albums
Columbia Records albums
Albums produced by Steve Hillage
Albums recorded at Record Plant (Los Angeles)